Chalipa is a panel in the Nastaliq script. There are two important panels in the Nastaliq calligraphy: Chalipa and Siah Mashgh. Chalipa consists of four diagonal hemistiches of a poem, which has clearly a moral, ethic and poetic theme.

References 

Typefaces
Calligraphy